Guy Mazzoni (29 August 1929 – 25 October 2002), was a French physician and chess player, two-times French Chess Championship winner (1961, 1965).

Biography
In the 1950s and 1960s Guy Mazzoni was one of the best French chess players. In 1958 he won Paris City Chess Championship. Guy Mazzoni has played in individual French Chess Championship finals many times and won 6 medals: 2 gold (1961, 1965) and 4 silver (1954, 1963, 1964, 1969). In 1963 in Enschede he first time participated in World Chess Championship Zonal tournament and shared 13th–14th place. In 1966 in The Hague he second time participated in World Chess Championship Zonal tournament and shared 14th–15th place. In 1967, Guy Mazzoni ranked 9th in Monte Carlo chess tournament.

Guy Mazzoni played for France in the Chess Olympiads:
 In 1964, at second board in the 16th Chess Olympiad in Tel Aviv (+7, =6, -3),
 In 1966, at first board in the 17th Chess Olympiad in Havana (+2, =5, -6).

References

External links

Guy Mazzoni chess games at 365chess.com

1929 births
2002 deaths
Sportspeople from Tunis
French chess players
Chess Olympiad competitors